Shirin Akter Shela is a Bangladeshi model and beauty pageant titleholder who was crowned Miss Universe Bangladesh 2019. She was a third year graduate student of the Physics Department of University of Dhaka. She is now pursuing a degree in Environmental Science and Management at Independent University Bangladesh.

Pageantry

Miss World Bangladesh 2018
Shela participated in Miss World Bangladesh 2018. She was among the top ten contestants in this competition.

Face of Bangladesh 2019
Shela was declared the best female model of Face of Bangladesh 2019.

Face of Asia 2019
Shela was a contestant of Face of Asia 2019 in South Korea's capital Seoul where she represented Bangladesh.

Miss Universe Bangladesh 2019
Shela was crowned as Miss Universe Bangladesh 2019 on 23 October 2019. She was crowned by the winner of Miss Universe 1994 by Sushmita Sen.

Miss Universe 2019
Shela represented Bangladesh during the Miss Universe 2019 competition that took place in Atlanta but she failed to place.

References

External links 

Miss Universe Bangladesh winners
Bangladeshi female models
Living people
Miss Universe 2019 contestants
People from Thakurgaon District
1990s births